The discography of the Japanese female idol group Momoiro Clover Z consists of 6 full-length studio albums and over 20 singles.

Discography

Singles 
Total sales update: April 21, 2018

Limited distribution singles

Other charted songs

Albums 
Total sales update: September 20, 2016

* When the two limited editions of Battle and Romance were re-released on April 10, 2013, the album updated its peak position to 2nd, selling approx. 38,000 copies in the re-release week

Compilation albums 

* During the week of Iriguchi no Nai Deguchis official release, the album reached #2, with 69,125 copies.

Limited distribution albums

Live DVDs and Blu-rays 
Total sales update: June 28, 2013

Music video collections

Documentaries and television programs

Musical 
Total sales update: June 28, 2013

Notes

References 

Discography
Pop music group discographies
Discographies of Japanese artists